The 2010–11 Bethune–Cookman Wildcats men's basketball team represented Bethune–Cookman University in the 2010–11 NCAA Division I men's basketball season. The Wildcats, led by head coach Clifford Reed, played their home games at Moore Gymnasium and the Ocean Center, both in Daytona Beach, Florida, as members of the Mid-Eastern Athletic Conference. The Wildcats won the MEAC regular-season title, their first since joining Division I in 1980.

Bethune–Cookman failed to qualify for the NCAA tournament, but received an automatic bid to the 2011 NIT as the regular-season champions of the MEAC. The Wildcats were eliminated in the first round of the NIT by Virginia Tech, 79–54.

Roster 

Source

Schedule and results

|-
!colspan=9 style=|Regular season

|-
!colspan=9 style=| MEAC tournament

|-
!colspan=9 style=| NIT

Source

References

Bethune–Cookman Wildcats men's basketball seasons
Bethune-Cookman
Bethune-Cookman
Bethune-Cookman men's basketball
Bethune-Cookman men's basketball